Laurent Biondi (born 19 July 1959, Grenoble France) is a former French cyclist. He was the Amateur Champion of France  in 1982 and turned professional in 1983, competing until 1993. Later he was the team manager of the Ag2r–La Mondiale.

Teams
1983 to 1984: La Redoute–Motobécane (France)
1985: Hitachi–Splendor (Belgium)
1986: Système U (France)
1986: Miko–Carlos (France)
1987: Système U (France)
1988: Toshiba (France)
1989: Fagor–MBK (France)
1990: History–Sigma (Belgium)
1991: Tonton Tapis–GB (Belgium)
1992: Chazal–Vanilla Mûre (France)
1993: Chazal–Vetta–MBK (France)

References

External links 
AG2R-LA MONDIALE Manager

French male cyclists
1959 births
Living people
Sportspeople from Grenoble
AG2R Citroën Team
UCI Track Cycling World Champions (men)
French track cyclists
Cyclists from Auvergne-Rhône-Alpes
21st-century French people
20th-century French people